is a former municipality in the old Nord-Trøndelag county, Norway. The  municipality existed from 1913 until its dissolution in 1964. The municipality included the northeastern portion of what is now the municipality of Steinkjer in Trøndelag county. The administrative centre was the village of Malm where Malm Church is located.

History

The municipality was established on 1 July 1913 when the western district of the municipality of Beitstad was separated to form the new municipality of Malm. The initial population of Malm was 993 people, which left Beitstad with 1,934. During the 1960s, there were many municipal mergers across Norway due to the work of the Schei Committee. On 1 January 1964, the municipality of Malm (population: 2,975) was merged with the neighboring municipality of Verran (population: 1,803), creating a new municipality called Verran.

Name
The municipality (originally the parish) is named after the old Malm farm since the first Malm Church was built there. Historically, the name was spelled Malme.

Government
While it existed, this municipality was responsible for primary education (through 10th grade), outpatient health services, senior citizen services, unemployment, social services, zoning, economic development, and municipal roads. During its existence, this municipality was governed by a municipal council of elected representatives, which in turn elected a mayor.

Mayors
The mayors of Malm:

 1913-1919: Karl Ertsaas (V)
 1920-1925: Karl Larsen (Ap)
 1926-1928: Martin Landsem (Bp)  
 1929-1931: Ole Kristian Olsen (Ap)
 1932-1934: Martin Landsem (Bp)  
 1935-1940: Ole Kristian Olsen (Ap)
 1940-1945: Martin Landsem (NS)
 1945-1948: Ole Kristian Olsen (Ap)
 1949-1964: Olav Stavrum (Ap)

Municipal council
The municipal council  of Malm was made up of 13 representatives that were elected to four year terms. The party breakdown of the final municipal council was as follows:

See also
List of former municipalities of Norway

References

Steinkjer
Former municipalities of Norway
1913 establishments in Norway
1964 disestablishments in Norway